Ilesboro is an unincorporated community in Washington Township, Hocking County, Ohio, United States.

History
Ilesboro was platted in 1835. The community was named for Henry Iles, the original owner of the town site. A post office was established at Ilesboro in 1852, and remained in operation until 1902.

References

Populated places in Hocking County, Ohio